Fagraea berteroana (orth. variant F. berteriana), commonly known as the pua keni keni, pua kenikeni or perfume flower tree, is a small spreading tree or a large shrub which grows in the sub-tropics, where temperatures are 10 °C or more. It is indigenous to the Samoa Islands where it is known as the pua-lulu plus in Tonga and Tahiti as pua. Its occurrence spans from New Caledonia to eastern Polynesia. The ITIS database clarifies the spelling of the name ("Published as "berteriana" in honor of Bertero; correctable to "berteroana,"..).

Description
The plant has quad-angular branches, blunt tipped leaves, and fragrant 7 cm tubular shaped flowers of creamy white, which become yellow with time.

Cultural use
The flowers are popular for making lei. The tree's name, in Hawaiian, means "ten cent flower", referring to the sale price for a lei made from them in the past.

References

Pukui & Elbert, Hawaiian dictionary

berteroana
Flora of the Tubuai Islands
Flora of Samoa